Megaflora (from Greek μέγας megas "large" and New Latin flora "plant life") refers to an exceptionally large plant species. Examples  of megaflora include the Sequoioideae of California and a number of extinct plant species from the Mesozoic.

Examples

Africa
Adansonia digitata

Oceania
Eucalyptus regnans

Eurasia
Ficus benghalensis

Central and South America
Ceroxylon quindiuense

North America
Sequoia sempervirens

See also
Megafauna
Megaherb

References

Flora